Pomonte may refer to:

Pomonte, Fara in Sabina, a village in the province of Rieti, Italy
Pomonte, Gualdo Cattaneo, a village in the province of Perugia, Italy
Pomonte, Marciana, a town in the province of Livorno, Italy
Pomonte, Scansano, a village in the province of Grosseto, Italy